Balmy Alley (formally Balmy Street) is a one-block-long alley that is home to the most concentrated collection of murals in the city of San Francisco. It is located in the south central portion of the Inner Mission District between 24th Street and Garfield Square. Since 1973, most buildings on the street have been decorated with a mural.

History 

The earliest murals in the alley date to 1972, painted by Mia Galivez and children in a local child care center. Artists Patricia Rodriquez and Graciela Carillo had rented an apartment on Balmy Alley and painted their first mural in the Alley, a jungle-underwater scene, in 1973. Their two-woman team soon expanded and became known as Las Mujeres Muralistas. Fellow member Irene Perez painted her own mural on the alley in 1973, depicting two back-to-back figures painting flutes.

In 1984, in a second significant wave of murals in the alley, Ray Patlan spearheaded the PLACA project to install murals throughout the alley featuring the common theme of a celebration of indigenous Central American cultures and a protest of US intervention in Central America. Topics of the murals included the Nicaraguan revolution, Óscar Romero, and the Guatemalan civil war. This culminated in the addition of twenty-seven murals during the summer of 1985, funded in part by a grant of $2,500 from the Zellerbach Foundation. This art project proved influential, inspiring the La Lucha Continua Art Park/La Lucha Mural Park in New York City the following year.

Painting continues regularly in the alley, including new murals about gentrification and police harassment in 2012 and a restoration of one of the PLACA murals in 2014.

Besides those listed above, artists who have produced murals in the alley include Juana Alicia, Susan Kelk Cervantes, Marta Ayala, Brooke Francher, Miranda Bergman, Osha Neuman, Neil Mackinnon, Carlos Loarca, Xochitl Nevel-Guerrero, and Sirron Norris.

Influence 

The Balmy Alley murals have been described, along with San Diego's Chicano Park and Los Angeles' Estrada Courts, as a leading example of mural environments that reclaim spaces for Chicanos and give expression to a history of Chicano displacement and marginalization.

The mural grouping in the alley is internationally recognized, both as an exemplar of activist art and as a tourist destination.

Context 
The Mission District has San Francisco's densest concentration of murals, often along political themes, sometimes described jointly as the "Mission School" of muralism. Balmy Alley is often cited as the leading concentration within the Mission. 

Nearby Clarion Alley, another mural grouping by local artists, was inspired by Balmy Alley.

See also
 Precita Eyes, a mural arts education group, located near Balmy Alley

References

External links 
 
San Francisco Mural Arts gallery of works in Balmy Alley
 Balmy Alley website

Murals in San Francisco
Mission District, San Francisco
Streets in San Francisco